RollerCon is a five-day convention, held yearly in Las Vegas for members of the roller derby community.

The convention was first held in 2005 and is organized by skaters Ivanna S. Pankin and Trish the Dish.

The 2012 conference was five days long. There was skating. There was drinking. Not at the same time. Attendance was projected to be over 5,000 people.

References

External links
 www.rollercon.com Official site

Roller derby
Las Vegas Valley conventions and trade shows
Annual events in Nevada
Recurring events established in 2004
2004 establishments in Nevada
Events in Las Vegas